Heinrich Lübbe (12 January 1884 in Nienburg, Province of Hanover – 14 March 1940 in Berlin) was a German engineer working for Dutch aircraft designer Anthony Fokker during the First World War. He devised the pioneering Stangensteuerung gun synchronizer which enabled a machine gun to fire through the arc of a fighter aircraft's propeller without the bullets striking the propeller's blades. It was first fitted to Leutnant Otto Parschau's Fokker A.III bearing IdFlieg military serial number A.16/15 in the late spring of 1915, to create the prototype of the entire line of Fokker Eindecker single-seat fighters to come.

In 1921 Lübbe purchased the bankrupt Friedrichshafen naval yards which had manufactured aircraft during the war. In 1925 he renamed the company Arado but his refusal to join the Nazi Party in 1936 led to his removal when Arado was nationalized.

1884 births
1940 deaths
People from Nienburg, Lower Saxony
People from the Province of Hanover
Engineers from Lower Saxony
20th-century German inventors